The pic de Nore at  is the highest point in the Montagne Noire, on the border of the Aude and Tarn departments, near to the Parc naturel régional du Haut-Languedoc in southern France. The Arnette and Clamoux rivers both have their sources on the slopes.

Landmarks
The main feature of the summit is the 102 metre transmission tower, which broadcasts:

 FM : 4 transmitters at 80 kW PAR.
 Analogue TV: 1 transmitter in VHF at 100 kW PAR / 2 transmitters in UHF at 56 kW PAR / 3 transmitters in UHF at 160 kW PAR / 1 transmitter in UHF at 205 kW PAR.
 Digital TV: 5 transmitters in UHF at 8 kW PAR.

Cycling 
Since 2002 the summit is the finishing line for two timed climbs from Mazamet and Villegly (flat until Cabrespine).

The current record holder for both routes is Michel Ambrosini:

 Mazamet (via Pradelles): 52'30 "(28.57 km/h)
 Cabrespine: 40'52 "(25.69 km/h)

The climb from Cabrespine is 17.5  km long with a 5.2% average gradient.

The climb from Mazamet is 17  km long with a 5.7% average gradient.

The climb from Mazamet (via Pradelles) is 25  km with a 3.9% average gradient.

The climb up the slopes of Mas Cabardès, is shorter, at 15.1  km with a 6.1% average gradient but with some very difficult passages over 13%.

The Tour de France passed over the summit for the first time on Stage 15 of the 2018 tour.

References

Landforms of Aude
Landforms of Tarn (department)
Nore